The 2018–19 season was the 101st season of competitive association football in Egypt.

National teams

Egypt national football team

Results and fixtures

Friendlies

2018 FIFA World Cup

Group A

Matches

2019 Africa Cup of Nations qualification

Group J

Egypt national under-23 football team

Results and fixtures

Friendlies

CAF competitions

CAF Champions League

2018 CAF Champions League

Preliminary round

First round

Group stage

Group A

Knockout phase

Quarter-finals

Semi-finals

Final

2018–19 CAF Champions League

Preliminary round

First round

Group stage

Group C

Group D

Knockout phase

Quarter-finals

CAF Confederation Cup

2018 CAF Confederation Cup

Preliminary round

First round

Play-off round

Group stage

Group B

Knockout phase

Quarter-finals

Semi-finals

2018–19 CAF Confederation Cup

First round

Play-off round

Group stage

Group D

Knockout phase

Quarter-finals

Semi-finals

Final

UAFA competitions

Arab Club Champions Cup

Play-off round

Group B

First round

Second round

Quarter-finals

Men's football

Egyptian Premier League

Egyptian Second Division

Group A

Group B

Group C

Egyptian Third Division

Egyptian Fourth Division

Cup competitions

Egypt Cup

Final

Egyptian Super Cup

References

 
Egyptian